Count Jean Alfred Octave de Chabannes la Palice (29 March 1871 – 29 August 1933) was a French sailor, who represented his country at the 1900 Summer Olympics in Meulan, France. De Chabannes la Palice, as helmsman, took the 4th place in first race of the 0.5 to 1 ton.

Further reading

References

External links

1871 births
1933 deaths
French male sailors (sport)
Sailors at the 1900 Summer Olympics – .5 to 1 ton
Olympic sailors of France
Counts of France
Sailors at the 1900 Summer Olympics – Open class